Streptococcaceae are a family of Gram-positive bacteria, placed within the order  Lactobacillales.  Representative genera include Lactococcus, Lactovum, and Streptococcus.

References

 
Lactobacillales
Bacteria families